John Douglas Miller (1860 in Hadley, near London – 1903) was a British printmaker. Most of his works are mezzotint translations of paintings by artists such as Joshua Reynolds, Luke Fildes, Frank Dicksee, George Richmond, William Blake Richmond, and Frederic Leighton. Biographical details regarding Miller are scant, but he is considered a "fine mezzotinter" in a period when demand for such skills was rapidly declining due to the rise of photomechanical techniques such as photogravure.

References

External links 
 Entry for John Douglas Miller on the Union List of Artist Names
 Works by John Douglas Miller in the collection of the National Portrait Gallery

British engravers
1860 births
1903 deaths
Artists from London
People from Chipping Barnet